SCORE Class M-Truck is a two or four-wheel drive medium utility vehicle that competes in the SCORE off-road race series races including the Baja 1000, Baja 500, Baja Sur 500, San Felipe 250, and the SCORE Desert Challenge.

Vehicle description
Two or four-wheel drive medium utility vehicle with a minimum weight 12,000 pounds. Vehicles built from a two or four-wheel drive utility vehicle. Vehicle must be marketed utility vehicle. This class is an open-production class and all components are not restricted unless otherwise stated. 

All vehicles in this class must comply with FMVSS and have an OEM VIN attached.

Engine
Manufacturer's body, engine, transmission, differentials, and chassis combinations must be retained.

Suspension
Minimum wheelbase 125 inches. Maximum track width 102 inches.

Body
Minimum weight 12,000 pounds. Must have a GVW (Gross Vehicle Weight) of 18,000 pounds minimum

References
SCORE International (2011). "2011-2015 Off-Road Racing Rules and Regulations".
SCORE International. " 2009 New Classes & Existing Class Rule Amendments"

External links
Official SCORE International website
Official SCORE International Journal
Official SCORE International Carbon TV channel